Vengeance is a 1958 Spanish drama film directed by Juan Antonio Bardem. It was co-produced with Italy, starring Italian Raf Vallone. Francisco Rabal narrates the film. It was shown at the 1958 Cannes Film Festival but not released in Spain until the following year. The film had serious troubles with Spanish censorship. Bardem even went to prison and it was an international scandal. It was nominated for the Academy Award for Best Foreign Language Film.

Plot 
Juan (Jorge Mistral) returns to town after being locked up for ten years for a crime he did not commit. Together with his sister Andrea (Carmen Sevilla) they decide to take revenge on who they believe is to blame for the family's ills: Luis "el Torcido" (Raf Vallone). To do this, the two brothers will join a gang of reapers looking for work in the fields of Castilla and whose boss is their rival.

Cast
 Carmen Sevilla as Andrea Díaz
 Raf Vallone as Luis 'El Torcido'
 Jorge Mistral as Juan Díaz
 José Prada as Santiago 'El Viejo'
 Manuel Alexandre as Pablo 'El Tinorio'
 Manuel Peiró as Maxi 'El Chico'
 Conchita Bautista as Cantante
 José Marco Davó
 Rafael Bardem
 Maria Zanoli
 Xan das Bolas as Segador gallego
 Rufino Inglés
 Ángel Álvarez
 Goyo Lebrero
 José Riesgo

See also
 List of submissions to the 31st Academy Awards for Best Foreign Language Film
 List of Spanish submissions for the Academy Award for Best Foreign Language Film

References

External links
 

1958 films
Italian drama films
1958 drama films
1950s Spanish-language films
Spain in fiction
Films directed by Juan Antonio Bardem
Spanish drama films
1950s Spanish films
1950s Italian films
Spanish films about revenge